The Nef River is a river of Chile. The river has its source at a proglacial lake, which is feed by Nef Glacier. It flows in a generally easterly direction until it discharges into the Baker River.

See also
List of rivers of Chile

Rivers of Chile
Rivers of Aysén Region